Qianjiang is a sub-prefectural city of south-central Hubei Province, China.

Toponymy 
Qianjiang's name means river diving, with the first character referring to qián shuǐ, the Chinese verb for diving, and the second character, jiāng, meaning river.

History
During the Spring and Autumn period and the Warring States period, the area belonged to the independent state of Chu.

In the Three Kingdoms period, the area of present-day Qianjiang was part of the Eastern Wu.

Part of Qianjiang was incorporated into the Tang dynasty as Jiangling County.

During the Five Dynasties and Ten Kingdoms period, the area belonged to the independent kingdom of Jingnan. Qianjiang County was first organized in 965 CE, during the Song dynasty.

In 1293, during the Yuan dynasty, local flooding prompted officials to move the county center to present-day .

Republic of China and World War II 
In 1925, circuits were abolished, and the area was directly administered by the province.

From the spring of 1930 to the winter of 1932, Qianjiang belonged to the Hunan–Hubei–Jiangxi Soviet.

In 1932, the area was organized by the Republic of China under the new  system, belonging to the province's Seventh Administrative Inspectorate. In 1934, the area was placed under the Sixth Administrative Inspectorate.

Qianjiang was occupied by the Japanese during the Sino-Japanese War from May 1939 to August 1945. The Japanese primarily used prominent local Chinese to run the "puppet" government, notably many members of the Zhang family. From the spring of 1942 to the autumn of 1945, the area hosted a number of regional resistance governments.

People's Republic of China 
The area was captured by the People's Liberation Army in December 1947.

Upon the foundation of the People's Republic of China in 1949, the area was placed under .

The communists from 1949 to early 1980s constructed a pharmaceutical plant, a textile factory, a book-printing factory, a large oil-and-gas drilling field, and other industrial installations in the Qianjiang area. As the national economic reform took force beginning in the late 1970s many of these state-run businesses went under.

During the period from 1959 to 1962, the largest "Cadre Camp" in China, or in the world as people at that time liked to call it, was established in Qianjiang. The camp was established due to fears of a potential war between the Soviet Union and China following the Sino-Soviet split. As a result of these fears, the Chinese government dispersed people and resources throughout the country. Many young college graduates were sent to local Cadre Camps to train and entrench. This was the so-called "Priority 1 Order" given by Vice Chairman Lin Biao and planned by Chairman Mao.

The young cadres in Qianjiang worked to improve the agricultural situation, such as draining hundreds of acres of a local lake to be used as farmland. However, this action caused damage to the local ecosystem.

Qianjiang was well known for abundant local produces. Prominent local produces include duck eggs and lily seeds. They were so abundant that the produces were often sold at a nominal price. However, around the year of 1960, Qianjiang didn't escape the fate of most Chinese towns and was swept by an extended famine that was grossly caused by the political destruction of the fundamental aspects of the economy (production, supply-chain, and ownership). Many in Qianjiang were starved to death.

People from Qianjiang and surrounding areas, compared with people from the rest of the Hubei Province, have a reputation for being generous, gentle, and sincere. Prior to the modern days, Qianjiang demonstrated traditional, agriculture-based, Chinese ethos. E.g., if the farmers consider a water buffalo has been hard-working and loyal they would not slaughter it. But rather they would wait until it ages and dies. Then they would bury it and then build it a tomb.

There was a labor camp during the communist era in the Qianjiang area. The conditions at the camp were harsh. People would often sneak out to seek additional food. However, they never attempted to escape because it was impossible to hide in any place during those decades. Every town was tightly controlled and monitored by the government. No one would provide a stranger shelter and would only report him immediately to the local government.

On May 25, 1988, Qianjiang County was abolished, and was replaced with a county-level city.

In October 1994, Qianjiang was re-organized as a sub-prefectural city.

Geography

Qianjiang is bordered by Tianmen to the north, Xiantao to the east, Jianli to the southeast, Jiangling County to the southwest, Jingzhou District to the west, and Shayang County to the northwest.

Qianjiang is home to many rivers and lakes. However, starting in the early 80's most of them disappeared due to urbanization and industrialization.

Climate

Administrative divisions 
As of 2020, Qianjiang administers 6 subdistricts, 10 towns, and 8 other township-level divisions.

Subdistricts 
Qianjiang administers the following 6 subdistricts:

Towns 
Qianjiang administers the following 10 towns:

Other township-level divisions 
Qianjiang administers the following 8 other township-level divisions:

Transport
National Highway 318 and the Yihuang Expressway from Yichang to Huangshi both pass through Qianjiang from east to west. The Xiangyue Highway from Xiangyang to Yueyang passes through Qianjing from south to north.

The Shanghai–Wuhan–Chengdu high-speed railway passes through Qianjiang from east to west.

The city has two deep-water ports: Zekou and Hongmiao.

Demographics
According to the 2010 Chinese Census, Qianjiang has a total population of 946,277, down from the 992,438 reported in the 2000 Chinese Census. In 1996, the city's population was estimated to be 933,000.

Economy
Qianjiang is a major producer of grain, cotton, petroleum, natural gas, and salt.

Qianjiang has an important oil field, Jianghan Oil Field. It's part of the Sinopec Corporation. Qianjiang has the potential of producing 200 million tons of oil, more than 9000 m3 of natural gas, and 800 billion tons of rock salt. In 2001 Qiangjiang started producing crayfish and now producers over 70,000 tonnes a year and accounting for over 60% of China's export of crayfish.  The region is also home to the world's largest crustacean sculpture.

Culture 
The city has a unique theatre culture, with Qianjiang Flower Drum Opera, Qianjiang Shadow Play, and Qianjiang Folk Song all being included in China's .

Notable sites 
 Ruins of Zhanghua Palace, built by King Ling of Chu
 Ruins of

Notable people 
 Li Hanjun
 Li Shucheng
 Lü Xiaojun
 Qian Ying
 Yao Lifa

References

External links
Jianghan Oil Field

Cities in Hubei
Wuhan urban agglomeration
Jianghan Plain
County-level divisions of Hubei